1131 Porzia, provisional designation , is a stony asteroid and sizable Mars-crosser from the innermost regions of the asteroid belt, approximately 7 kilometers in diameter. It was discovered on 10 September 1929, by German astronomer Karl Reinmuth at the Heidelberg Observatory in southwest Germany. The asteroid was named after Porcia wife of Brutus, who assassinated Julius Caesar.

Orbit and classification 

Porzia is a Mars-crossing asteroid, a dynamically unstable group between the main belt and the near-Earth populations, crossing the orbit of Mars at 1.666 AU. It orbits the Sun at a distance of 1.6–2.9 AU once every 3 years and 4 months (1,215 days). Its orbit has an eccentricity of 0.29 and an inclination of 3° with respect to the ecliptic. The body's observation arc begins at Heidelberg, 19 days after its official discovery observation.

Physical characteristics 

In the SMASS taxonomy, Porzia is a common stony S-type asteroid.

Lightcurves 

Two rotational lightcurves of Porzia were obtained by Vladimir Benishek at Belgrade Observatory shortly before its opposition in November 2009, and by French amateur astronomer René Roy in December 2012. Lightcurve analysis gave a well defined rotation period of 4.6584 and 4.6601 hours with a brightness variation of 0.15 and 0.19 magnitude, respectively.

The results supersede photometric observations taken by Polish astronomer Wiesław Wiśniewski in January 1990, which rendered a lightcurve with a period  hours and an amplitude of 0.23 magnitude.

Diameter and albedo 

According to the survey carried out by NASA's Wide-field Infrared Survey Explorer and its subsequent NEOWISE mission, Porzia measures 6.53 kilometers in diameter and its surface has an albedo of 0.287, while the Collaborative Asteroid Lightcurve Link assumes a standard albedo for stony asteroids of 0.20 and calculates a diameter of 7.13 kilometers with an absolute magnitude of 13.10.

This makes Porzia one of the larger mid-sized Mars-crossing asteroids comparable with 1065 Amundsenia (9.75 km), 1139 Atami (9.35 km), 1474 Beira (8.73 km), 1011 Laodamia (7.5 km), 1727 Mette (est. 9 km), 1235 Schorria (est. 9 km), 985 Rosina (8.18 km), 1310 Villigera (15.24 km) and 1468 Zomba (7 km), but far smaller than the largest members of this dynamical group, namely, 132 Aethra, 323 Brucia, 1508 Kemi, 2204 Lyyli and 512 Taurinensis, which are all larger than 20 kilometers in diameter.

Naming 

This minor planet was named after the wife of Brutus, Porcia Catonis, who kills herself at news of her husband's death in Shakespeare's play Julius Caesar. The official naming citation was also published by Paul Herget in The Names of the Minor Planets in 1955.

References

External links 
 Photometry of Asteroids at The Belgrade Astronomical Observatory, Vladimir Benishek's Page
 Asteroid Lightcurve Database (LCDB), query form (info )
 Dictionary of Minor Planet Names, Google books
 Asteroids and comets rotation curves, CdR – Observatoire de Genève, Raoul Behrend
 Discovery Circumstances: Numbered Minor Planets (1)-(5000) – Minor Planet Center
 
 

 

001131
Discoveries by Karl Wilhelm Reinmuth
Named minor planets
001131
19290910